Inspector is a 1953 Indian Tamil language film directed by R. S. Mani. It is an adaptation of the play of the same name. The film stars T. K. Shanmugam, S. Balachander, Anjali Devi and P. K. Saraswathi.

Plot 
A police inspector helps a young man who is a classmate of his sister. The young man is a kind person and he moves like one in the family. The inspector's sister falls in love with the young man. She wants to learn dancing. The young man arranges a dance master to teach her. But the dance master is an opportunist and he seduces the girl. She becomes pregnant. The inspector and his wife wants to marry her to the young man without knowing her pregnancy. However, the young man is in love with a village lass. The dance master sees the village beauty and sets his roving eyes on her.  He rejects the responsibility for the pregnancy of the young woman. How all these problems are settled forms the rest of the story.

Cast 
List Compiled from the database of Film News Anandan and from the Hindu review article.

Male cast
T. K. Shanmugam
S. Balachander
T. K. Bhagavathi
S. A. Natarajan
T. N. Sivathanu
M. R. Santhanam
M. S. Karuppaiah
Master K. N. Krishnan
K. N. Venkataraman
A. Ganesh Singh
T. V. Jayaraman

Female cast
Anjali Devi
M. S. Draupathi
P. K. Saraswathi
S. R. Janaki
K. Rathinam
Bhoodevi
C. R. Rajakumari (Dance)

Production 
Inspector was adapted from the TKS Brothers play of the same name. It  was produced by M. Somasundaram and S. K. Mohideen under the banner Jupiter Pictures and was directed by R. S. Mani. N. Somasundaram wrote the screenplay and dialogues. Nemai Gosh was in charge of photography while the editing was done by K. Govidasamy. Art direction was by Thanu and the choreography was handled by K. S. Ramasami, Hiralal and V. Madhavan. Still photography was done by R. N. Nagaraja Rao. The film was shot at Neptune Studios, Adyar, Chennai and processed at the Jupiter laboratory. The film was also produced in Telugu.

Soundtrack 
Music was composed by G. Ramanathan while the lyrics were penned by Ku. Ma. Balasubramaniam, Ku. Sa. Krishnamoorthy, T. K. Sundara Vathiyar, A. Maruthakasi and Ka. Mu. Sheriff.

Reception 
Unlike the play, the film adaptation was a commercial failure.

References

External links 
 

1950s Tamil-language films
1953 drama films
1953 films
Films scored by G. Ramanathan
Indian drama films
Indian films based on plays
Jupiter Pictures films